Feel.Love.Thinking.Of. is the second studio album by the rock band Faunts. It was released in 2009.

Track listing
"Feel.Love.Thinking.Of."  – 3:09 (featured on the soundtrack of NHL 2K10)
"Input"  – 2:41
"It Hurts Me All the Time"  – 3:12
"Out On a Limb"  – 4:11
"Lights Are Always On"  – 5:46
"Das Malefitz"  – 4:05 (featured on the soundtrack of Mass Effect 3)
"I Think I'll Start a Fire"  – 4:30
"Alarmed/Lights"  – 7:40
"So Far Away"  – 3:11
"Explain"  – 6:12

References 

2009 albums
Faunts albums